Events in the year 1988 in Mexico.

Incumbents

Federal government
 President: Miguel de la Madrid (until November 30), Carlos Salinas de Gortari (starting December 1)
 Interior Secretary (SEGOB): Manuel Bartlett Díaz/Fernando Gutiérrez Barrios
 Secretary of Foreign Affairs (SRE): Bernardo Sepúlveda Amor/Fernando Solana
 Communications Secretary (SCT): Daniel Díaz Díaz/Andrés Caso Lombardo
 Education Secretary (SEP): Manuel Bartlett
 Secretary of Defense (SEDENA): Juan Arévalo Gardoqui/Antonio Riviello Bazán
 Secretary of Navy: Miguel Ángel Gómez Ortega/Mauricio Scheleske Sánchez
 Secretary of Labor and Social Welfare: Arsenio Farell Cubillas
 Secretary of Welfare: Manuel Camacho Solís/Gabino Fraga/Patricio Chirinos Calero
 Secretary of Public Education: Miguel González Avelar/Manuel Bartlett Díaz
 Tourism Secretary (SECTUR): Carlos Hank González 
 Secretary of the Environment (SEMARNAT): Pedro Ojeda Paullada/María de los Angeles Moreno
 Secretary of Health (SALUD): Guillermo Soberón Acevedo/Jesús Kumate Rodríguez

Supreme Court

 President of the Supreme Court: Carlos del Río Rodríguez

Governors

 Aguascalientes: Miguel Ángel Barberena Vega
 Baja California: Xicoténcatl Leyva Mortera (PRI)
 Baja California Sur: Víctor Manuel Liceaga Ruibal
 Campeche: Abelardo Carrillo Zavala
 Chiapas: Absalón Castellanos Domínguez/Patrocinio González Garrido
 Chihuahua: Fernando Baeza Meléndez
 Coahuila: Eliseo Mendoza Berrueto
 Colima: Elías Zamora Verduzco
 Durango: Armando del Castillo Franco
 Guanajuato: Rafael Corrales Ayala
 Guerrero: José Francisco Ruiz Massieu
 Hidalgo: Adolfo Lugo Verduzco
 Jalisco: Enrique Álvarez del Castillo/Francisco Rodríguez Gómez
 State of Mexico: Mario Ramón Beteta 
 Michoacán: Luis Martínez Villicaña
 Morelos
Lauro Ortega Martínez (PRI), until May 18.
Antonio Riva Palacio (PRI), starting May 18.
 Nayarit: Celso Humberto Delgado Ramírez
 Nuevo León: Jorge Treviño
 Oaxaca: Heladio Ramírez López
 Puebla: Mariano Piña Olaya
 Querétaro: Mariano Palacios Alcocer
 Quintana Roo: Miguel Borge Martín
 San Luis Potosí: no data
 Sinaloa: Francisco Labastida
 Sonora: Rodolfo Félix Valdés
 Tabasco: José María Peralta López
 Tamaulipas: Américo Villarreal Guerra	
 Tlaxcala: Beatriz Paredes Rangel
 Veracruz: Fernando Gutiérrez Barrios/Dante Delgado Rannauro
 Yucatán: Víctor Cervera Pacheco/Víctor Manzanilla Schaffer
 Zacatecas: Genaro Borrego Estrada
Regent of Mexico City
Ramón Aguirre Velázquez
Manuel Camacho Solís

Events

 The National Council for Culture and Arts is established. 
 The Graphic Arts Institute of Oaxaca is established
 July 6: 1988 Mexican general election
 August 31 – September 8: Hurricane Debby
 September 8–19: Hurricane Gilbert

Awards
Belisario Domínguez Medal of Honor – Rufino Tamayo

Film

 List of Mexican films of 1988

Sport

 1987–88 Mexican Primera División season 
 Diablos Rojos del México win the Mexican League.
 Atlético Boca del Río and Venados de Yucatán are founded.
 1988 Mexican Grand Prix 
 Mexico at the 1988 Winter Olympics
 Mexico at the 1988 Summer Olympics
 Mexico at the 1988 Summer Paralympics 
 1988 Ibero-American Championships in Athletics in Mexico City.

Births
 February 5 – Karin Ontiveros, beauty queen
 April 29 — Elías Hernández, footballer
 May 21 — Aída Román, archer
November 23 — Ezequiel Orozco, soccer player (Club Necaxa), (d. 2018)

Deaths
April 25 — Roberto Salido Beltrán, military aviator (b. 1912)
July 11 — Oscar Flores Tapia, journalist, writer, and politician (PRI); Governor of Coahuila 1975–1981 (b. 1913)
August 9 – Ramón Valdés, Mexican actor (b. 1923)
December 9 – Alfredo Woodward Téllez, businessman and politician (b. 1905)

References

 
Mexico